Madeleine Bélanger (née Audet; born April 7, 1932) is a Quebec politician who served as a Member of the National Assembly of Quebec (MNA) for the riding of Mégantic-Compton from 1983 until 2003. Following the death of her second husband, Fabien Bélanger, on October 2, 1983, she was elected as his replacement on December 5, 1983. She served as a member of the Quebec Liberal Party.

Bélanger's daughter, Johanne Gonthier, served as the Liberal MNA for the same riding from 2007 to 2012. Bélanger's nephew, Gérard Gosselin, served as a Parti Québécois MNA for Sherbrooke from 1976 to 1981.

Biography
Bélanger was born April 7, 1932 in Saint-Sébastien, Quebec to Léopold Audet, a farmer, and Zélia Saint-Pierre. She worked as an elementary school teacher at Saint-Samuel-Station for three years. She owned two hairdressing salons and worked as an administrator and manager of a home electrical installation company for three years, then as a director of two residential development companies.

Political career

Bélanger's husband, Fabien Bélanger, died suddenly on October 2, 1983. She secured the Liberal nomination for Mégantic-Compton and won the ensuing by-election. She was re-elected in 1985, 1989, 1994 and 1998. Bélanger served as Parliamentary Assistant to the Minister of Municipal Affairs during the brief government of Daniel Johnson Jr. and later became Chair of the Committee on Planning and the Public Domain as well as the Chairperson of the Committee on Education during her time in office.

She did not seek re-election in 2003.

Electoral record

Provincial

References

1932 births
Living people
Canadian hairdressers
Canadian schoolteachers
Quebec Liberal Party MNAs
People from Estrie
Real estate and property developers
Women MNAs in Quebec
20th-century Canadian legislators
20th-century Canadian women politicians
21st-century Canadian legislators
21st-century Canadian women politicians